Lennon is a crater on Mercury. Its name was adopted by the International Astronomical Union (IAU) in 2013. Lennon is named for the English singer and songwriter John Lennon (of The Beatles).

Lennon lies on the south rim of the ancient Lennon-Picasso Basin.

References

Impact craters on Mercury